Godfried Ayesu Owusu Frimpong (born 21 April 1999) is a Dutch professional footballer who plays as a defender for Portuguese side Moreirense in Liga Portugal 2.

Club career
Frimpong joined Primeira Liga side Moreirense in July 2021.

International career
Born in the Netherlands, Frimpong is of Ghanaian descent. Frimpong is a youth international for the Netherlands.

Career statistics

Club

Honours
Benfica
 Campeonato Nacional de Juniores: 2017–18

References

External links
Ons Oranje U16 Profile

1999 births
Living people
Footballers from Rotterdam
Dutch footballers
Netherlands youth international footballers
Dutch sportspeople of Ghanaian descent
Association football defenders
Primeira Liga players
Liga Portugal 2 players
Sparta Rotterdam players
S.L. Benfica B players
Moreirense F.C. players
Dutch expatriate footballers
Dutch expatriate sportspeople in Portugal
Expatriate footballers in Portugal